Darur Pullaiah is an Indian politician belonging to the Indian National Congress. He was elected to the Lok Sabha, the lower house of the Indian Parliament, from Anantapur, Andhra Pradesh in 1977 and 1980. He was a student of Loyola College and studied law in Madras Law College.

References

External links
Official biographical sketch in Parliament of India website

Living people
1939 births
India MPs 1977–1979
India MPs 1980–1984
Indian National Congress politicians from Andhra Pradesh
Lok Sabha members from Andhra Pradesh
People from Anantapur, Andhra Pradesh